Penn-Jersey Spirit played in the American Professional Soccer League in 1990 and 1991.  The team's home stadium was Lions Stadium in Ewing, New Jersey, on the campus of Trenton State College (today known as the College of New Jersey). The team also played a small number of home games at La Salle University.

The team was coached by Dave MacWilliams and assisted by former local professional player Tom O'Dea. Mike Romeo was the team's goalkeeper coach. Notable players included Cris Vaccaro and Dan Donigan as well as a pair of current NCAA Division I coaches, Dave Masur of St. John's University and George Gelnovatch of University of Virginia. The team also had Matt Knowles, who was the first draft pick of the New York/New Jersey Metrostars in 1996.

The original ownership group included Spencer Rockman and Pat Varsalona, who were the co-founders of the Garden State Soccer League, New Jersey's largest adult semipro/amateur soccer league and long-time soccer entrepreneur Charles Cuttone, who sold his interest before the team's first season. Then Rutgers head coach Bob Reasso served as the team's General Manager. 

Although reasonably well-supported, the team ceased operations after its second season.

Ownership
 Spencer Rockman - Co-Owner  
 Pat Varsalona - Co-Owner
 Vincent Baldino - Co-Owner
 Charles Cuttone - Co-Owner

Coaching staff
 Dave MacWilliams - Head Coach (1990-1991)
 Paulo Dias - Head Coach (1991)
 Tom O'Dea - Assistant Coach
 Mike Romeo - Goalkeeping Coach

Honors
First Team All Star
 1990  Dale Caya, Brian Ainscough, George Gelnovatch, Dan Donigan

Second Team All Star
 1990 Pat O'Kelley

Year-by-year

References 

Defunct soccer clubs in New Jersey
American Professional Soccer League teams
1990 establishments in New Jersey
1991 disestablishments in New Jersey
Soccer clubs in New Jersey
Association football clubs disestablished in 1991
Association football clubs established in 1990
Ewing Township, New Jersey